A lawn is an area of land planted with grass and sometimes clover and other plants, which are maintained at a low, even height.

Lawn may also refer to:

Places
The Lawn (Harlow), the first residential tower block built in the UK
Lawn, Newfoundland and Labrador, Canada
Lawn, Pennsylvania, United States
Lawn, Texas, United States
Lawn, West Virginia, United States
The Lawn, Lincoln, a grade II listed building in the Greek Revival style, in Lincoln England
The Lawn Ground, a former football ground in England

People with the name
 Chris Lawn (born 1972), former Tyrone Gaelic footballer
 Edward Lawn, a Canadian politician from Campbell's Bay, Quebec
 John C. Lawn (21st century), FBI agent
 John J. Lawn, an American politician

Other uses
Lawn (band), a Dutch alternative-indie rock band
Lawn cloth, a plain weave textile
 LAWN, a wireless LAN (local area wireless network)
Bacterial lawn, a concept in microbiology
The Lawn, a court at the University of Virginia in the United States

See also